Edgar Nohales Nieto (born 28 July 1986) is a Spanish cyclist, who currently rides for UCI Continental team .

Major results
2006
 1st Trofeo San Juan y San Pedro
2013
 8th Overall Le Tour de Filipinas
2016
 5th Overall Jelajah Malaysia
2017
 Tour de Flores
1st Mountains classification
1st Stage 4
 4th Overall Tour of Xingtai
 6th Overall Tour de Molvccas
 6th Overall Le Tour de Filipinas
 9th Overall Tour de Lombok
2019
 2nd Overall Tour of Guam

References

External links

1986 births
Living people
Spanish male cyclists
Sportspeople from Valladolid
Cyclists from Castile and León